Damarion  Williams (born July 15, 1998) is an American football cornerback for the Baltimore Ravens of the National Football League (NFL). He played college football at Highland and Houston.

Professional career

Williams was selected by the Baltimore Ravens in the fourth round (141st overall) of the 2022 NFL Draft.

References

External links
 Baltimore Ravens bio
Highland Scotties bio
Houston Cougars bio

Living people
1998 births
American football cornerbacks
Players of American football from Atlanta
Players of American football from Miami
Highland Scotties football players
Houston Cougars football players
Baltimore Ravens players